The Harut River or Adraskan River is a river of Afghanistan. It is a river which belongs to the Sistan Basin. The source of the river lies in the mountains to the southeast of Herat. The river flows for about  into the Sistan Lake. Along its course are various canals for irrigation, particularly in the plains of Sabzvar and Anardarah. The Khushkek River enters the Harut.

References

Rivers of Afghanistan
Landforms of Herat Province